"The devil you know" is a reference to the proverb "better the devil you know than the devil you don't", describing ambiguity aversion.

The Devil You Know may refer to:

Film and television
 The Devil You Know (film), a 2013 thriller film
 "The Devil You Know" (Justified), an episode of the TV series Justified
 "The Devil You Know" (Person of Interest), an episode of the TV series Person of Interest
 "The Devil You Know" (Stargate SG-1), an episode of the television series Stargate SG-1
 "The Devil You Know" (Supernatural), an episode of the television series Supernatural
 The Devil You Know, a 2015 American drama series pilot written by Jenji Kohan
 The Devil You Know (TV series), a series on cable channel Investigation Discovery
 "The Devil You Know" (Yes Minister), a 1981 episode of the BBC comedy series Yes Minister

Literature
 The Devil You Know (short story collection), a collection by Poppy Z. Brite
 The Devil You Know, a novel by Mike Carey
 The Devil You Know: A Black Power Manifesto, a 2021 book by Charles M. Blow

Music
 Light the Torch, American metalcore band formerly known as Devil You Know
 The Devil You Know (Econoline Crush album), 1997
 The Devil You Know, a 2006 album by Todd Snider
 The Devil You Know (Heaven & Hell album), 2009
 The Devil You Know (Rickie Lee Jones album), 2012
 The Devil You Know (The Coathangers album), 2019
 "The Devil You Know", a 1993 song by Jesus Jones from Perverse
 "The Devil You Know", a song by Bill Russell and Henry Krieger from the 1997 musical Side Show
 "The Devil You Know", a 2011 song by Anthrax from Worship Music
 "The Devil You Know", a 2015 song by Sharon Kovacs
 The Devils You Know, an album by punk band The Other
 The Devil You Know (L.A. Guns album), 2019

See also
Devil You Know (disambiguation)